Alexander Kay (1879 – 15 February 1917) was a Scottish professional football left back who played in the Scottish League for St Bernard's and Partick Thistle. He also played in the Football League for Sheffield United.

Personal life 
A pre-war Royal Scot, Kay served as a rifleman in the Rifle Brigade (Prince Consort's Own) during the First World War and was killed on the Western Front on 15 February 1917. He is commemorated on the Thiepval Memorial.

Career statistics

References 

Scottish footballers
1917 deaths
British Army personnel of World War I
British military personnel killed in World War I
1879 births
Rifle Brigade soldiers
Scottish Football League players
St Bernard's F.C. players
Partick Thistle F.C. players
Footballers from Edinburgh
Sheffield United F.C. players
English Football League players
Association football fullbacks
Royal Scots soldiers
Norwich City F.C. players